HAT-P-18 is a K-type main-sequence star about 530 light-years away. The star is very old and has a concentration of heavy elements similar to solar abundance.  A survey in 2015 detected very strong starspot activity on HAT-P-18.

Planetary system
In 2010 a transiting hot Saturn-sized planet was detected. Its equilibrium temperature is 841 K.

In 2014, observations utilizing the Rossiter–McLaughlin effect detected an exoplanet, HAT-P-18b, on a retrograde orbit, with an angle between orbital plane of the planet and the parent star equatorial plane equal to 132°.

Transit-timing variation measurements in 2015 did not detect additional planets in the system.

In 2016, the transmission optical spectra of the planet indicated that the atmosphere is lacking detectable clouds or hazes, and is blue in color due to Rayleigh scattering of light. The atmosphere seems to gradually evaporate, but at a slow rate - less than 2% of planetary mass is lost per one billion years. By contrast, spectra taken in 2022 has showed an extensive hazes and clear evidence of water vapour, along with the tail of escaping helium.

The dayside temperature of HAT-P-18b was measured in 2019 to be 1004 K.

References

Hercules (constellation)
K-type main-sequence stars
Planetary systems with one confirmed planet
Planetary transit variables
J17052315+3300450